A Mero Hajur 2 is a 2017 Nepali musical romantic movie directed by Jharana Thapa The second part of A Mero Hajur series, the film stars Samragyee RL Shah and debutant Salin Man Baniya in lead roles. The movie received mixed to negative response from critics with praise for its music but performances of the actors, direction, routine story and screenplay met with negative response from audience and critics. But the film had a huge opening weekend at the box office and owing to that it became a huge success at the box office. The success of the movie was credited for the massive popularity of its predecessor starring Shree Krishna Shrestha and Jharana Thapa and music of the film. The film had further two sequels.

Cast
 Salin Man Baniya
 Samragyee RL Shah
 Jharana Thapa
 Salon Basnet
 Swatantra Pratap Shah
 Roshan Rx (From Assam)
 Amber Subedi
 Suman Poudel
 Ajashra Dhungana
 Anubhav Regmi
 Buddhi Tamang
 Anurag Kuwar
 Wilson Bikram Rai
 Asin Crystal RI Rana.

Visual Effects Artist
Achyut Bajagain

Editor
 Shahil Khan

Costume Designer
 Yubi Thapa

Songs

References

External links

Nepalese romantic comedy films
2010s Nepali-language films
2017 films
Films shot in Kathmandu
Films directed by Jharana Thapa
Nepalese sequel films
2017 directorial debut films